In linguistics, the term T-unit was coined by Kellogg Hunt in 1965. It is defined as the "shortest grammatically allowable sentences into which (writing can be split) or minimally terminable unit." Often, but not always, a T-unit is a sentence.

More technically, a T-unit is a dominant clause and its dependent clauses: as Hunt said, it is "one main clause with all subordinate clauses attached to it" (Hunt 1965:20). T-units are often used in the analysis of written and spoken discourse, such as in studies on errors in second language writing. The number of error-free T-units may be counted, as in Robb et al. (1986), or changes in accuracy per T-unit overdrafts of compositions may be measured (Sachs and Polio, 2007).

Young (1995) gives some examples of what a T-unit is and is not:"The following elements were counted as one T-unit: a single clause, a matrix plus subordinate clause, two or more phrases in apposition, and fragments of clauses produced by ellipsis. Co-ordinate clauses were counted as two t-units. Elements not counted as t-units include backchannel cues such as mhm and yeah, and discourse boundary markers such as okay, thanks or good. False starts were integrated into the following t-unit." (Young 1995:38)

See also
 Clause
 Sentence (linguistics)

References

External links
 Reading complexity judgments: Episode
 Foster, P., Tonkyn, A. and Wigglesworth, G. (2000). Measuring spoken language: a unit for all reasons Applied Linguistics 21/3:354-375.

Syntactic entities